Guillaume Le Rouge (G. Le Rouge or W(illelmus) de Rouge; fl. 1450–1465) was a Netherlands musician of the Burgundian school. He took a position at the court of Charles d'Orleans, serving in the chapel from 1451 to 1465. One song remains of his compositions, Se je fais duel je n’en ouis mais.

References

Year of birth unknown
Year of death unknown
Dutch male classical composers
Dutch classical composers
Renaissance composers